para-Chlorophenylpiperazine (pCPP) is a psychoactive drug of the phenylpiperazine class. It is relatively obscure, with limited human use, and produces slightly psychedelic effects. It has been encountered in illicit capsules as a recreational drug similarly to other piperazines like mCPP. Scientific research has demonstrated pCPP to have serotonergic effects, likely acting as a non-selective serotonin receptor agonist and/or releasing agent.

A known use has been in the synthesis of L-745,870.

See also 
 Substituted piperazine

References 

Chlorobenzenes
Phenylpiperazines
Serotonin receptor agonists
Serotonin releasing agents